Archidistoma is a genus of tunicates in the family Polycitoridae.

List of species:

Archidistoma aggregatum
Archidistoma dublum

References 

Enterogona
Tunicate genera